José Javier González Alponte ( May 11, 1939 – April 11, 2018) was a Peruvian football midfielder who played for Peru in the 1970 FIFA World Cup. He also played for Sport Boys and  Alianza Lima.

References

External links
FIFA profile

1939 births
2018 deaths
Peruvian footballers
Peru international footballers
Association football midfielders
Club Alianza Lima footballers
Sport Boys footballers
1970 FIFA World Cup players